The Short-maned sand-eel (Phaenomonas cooperae) is an eel in the family Ophichthidae (worm/snake eels). It was described by Geoffrey Palmer in 1970. It is a marine, tropical eel which is known from the Indo-Pacific, including the Red Sea, the Aldabra Islands, the Hawaiian Islands, and the Marquesan Islands.

References

Ophichthidae
Fish described in 1970